Events from the year 1878 in France.

Incumbents
President: Patrice de MacMahon, Duke of Magenta
President of the Council of Ministers: Jules Armand Dufaure

Events
 1 May–10 November – Exposition Universelle in Paris; the head of the Statue of Liberty is a principal exhibit.
 May – Chemins de fer de l'État formed to take over ten small railway companies operating between the Loire and Garonne.

Births

January to June
 5 February – Jean Becquerel, physicist (died 1953)
 5 February – André Citroën, automobile pioneer (died 1935)
 21 February – Mirra Alfassa, spiritual leader (died 1973)
 28 February – Pierre Fatou, mathematician (died 1929)
 24 March – René Baudichon, sculptor and medallist (died 1963)
 2 April – Émilie Charmy, artist (died 1974)
 17 April – Albert Canet, tennis player
 3 May – Jean Chiappe, civil servant (died 1940)
 26 May – Charles Burguet, film director (died 1946)
 28 May – Paul Pelliot, sinologist and explorer (died 1945)
 8 June – Yvonne Prévost, tennis player (died 1942)

July to December
 22 July – Lucien Febvre, social historian (died 1956)
 16 August – Léon Binoche, rugby union player (died 1962)
 2 September – Maurice René Fréchet, mathematician (died 1973)
 15 October – Paul Reynaud, politician and lawyer (died 1966)
 17 October – Henri Mulet, organist and composer (died 1967)
 14 November – Julie Manet, painter and art collector (died 1966)
 23 November – André Caplet, composer and conductor (died 1925)

Full date unknown
 Georges Garnier, soccer player (died 1936)

Deaths
 7 January – François-Vincent Raspail, chemist, physiologist and socialist (born 1794)
 8 January – Charles Cousin-Montauban, Comte de Palikao, general and statesman (born 1796)
 18 January – Antoine César Becquerel, scientist (born 1788)
 19 January – Henri Victor Regnault, chemist and physicist (born 1810)
 11 February – Auguste Poulet-Malassis, printer and publisher (born 1825)
 19 February – Charles-François Daubigny, painter (born 1817)
 2 April – Louis Léonard de Loménie, author (born 1815)
 8 April – Eugène Belgrand, engineer (born 1810)
 6 May – François Benoist, composer and organist (born 1794)
 25 May – Antoine Laurent Dantan, sculptor (born 1798)
 6 June – Achille Baraguey d'Hilliers, Marshal of France and politician (born 1795)
 12 June - George V of Hanover, German monarch of kingdom Hannover (born 1819)
 2 September – Garcin de Tassy, orientalist (born 1794)
 11 October – Félix Dupanloup, Bishop of Orléans (born 1802)
 31 October – Louis-Antoine Garnier-Pagès, politician (born 1803)
 8 November – Joseph-Epiphane Darras, historian (born 1825)

Full date unknown
 Amédée Faure, painter (born 1801)
 Nicolas Rémy Maire, bow maker (born 1800)

References

1870s in France